Rokas Giedraitis (born August 16, 1992) is a Lithuanian professional basketball player for Baskonia of the Liga ACB and the EuroLeague. He plays at the small forward position.

Professional career
In 2013, Giedraitis was named Finals MVP of the NKL after scoring 26 points and leading his team to title. He then signed with BC Šiauliai club in which his father played his whole career. After continuing his solid playing, Giedraitis was later signed by the Lithuanian powerhouse Lietuvos rytas Vilnius and joined it in 2015. On July 5, 2018, Giedraitis terminated his contract with the team. On July 6, 2018, he signed a three-year contract with Alba Berlin of the Basketball Bundesliga. On July 4, 2020, Giedraitis signed a three-year deal with the Spanish League champions Saski Baskonia. On 9 October 2020, Giedraitis scored 26 points in the EuroLeague and this way achieved his new career-high in the league.

National team career
He won two gold medals with Lithuania national teams: FIBA World U-19 in 2011 and Europe U-20 in 2012. In 2015 Giedraitis was included into the Lithuania men's national basketball team head coach Jonas Kazlauskas extended candidates list. He also participated in the national team training camp, but was released on August 16. He returned to the national team in 2016, but yet again was quickly released on July 5.
In 2017, Giedraitis was invited to team's training camp in preparation for the EuroBasket 2017 championship, only to be released on August 11.

In 2019, at the age of 27, Giedraitis made his national team debut, after being selected to the final 12-man roster for the 2019 FIBA Basketball World Cup by the head coach Dainius Adomaitis.

Career statistics

EuroLeague

|-
| style="text-align:left;"| 2019–20
| style="text-align:left;"| Alba Berlin
| 25 || 21 || 26.5 || .469 || .398 || .844 || 4.0 || 1.4 || 1.4 || .1 || 13.8 || 14.7
|-
| style="text-align:left;"| 2020–21
| style="text-align:left;" rowspan=2| Baskonia
| 34 || 33 || 28.5 || .475	 || .405 || .824 || 3.0 || 1.5 || 1.1 || .1 || 12.7 || 12.9
|-
| style="text-align:left;"| 2021–22
| 29 || 26 || 28.1 || .459	 || .398 || .806 || 3.2 || 1.3 || 1.0 || .1 || 11.1 || 11.8

EuroCup

|-
| style="text-align:left;"| 2015–16
| style="text-align:left;" rowspan="3" | Lietuvos Rytas
| 10 || 2 || 17.5 || .428 || .217 || .889 || 1.8 || 0.6 || 1.0 || 0.4 || 6.1 || 5.0
|-
| style="text-align:left;"| 2016–17
| 14 || 0 || 21.3 || .494 || .410 || .765 || 2.2 || 0.5 || .0 || 0.4 || 9.7 || 8.0
|-
| style="text-align:left;"| 2017–18
| 16 || 1 || 25.0 || .483 || .360 || .689 || 2.9 || 1.6 || 1.2 || 0.4 || 12.4 || 11.8
|-
| style="text-align:left;"| 2018–19
| style="text-align:left;"| ALBA
| 24 || 21 || 27.5 || .486 || .421 || .846 || 4.1 || 1.4 || 1.6 || 0.3 || 14.8 || 15.8
|- class="sortbottom"
| style="text-align:left;"| Career
| style="text-align:left;"|
| 64 || 24 || 24.3 || .476 || .387 || .787 || 3.0 || 1.1 || 1.0 || 0.3 || 11.7 || 11.3

Personal life
He is the son of the basketball coach and former BC Šiauliai star Robertas Giedraitis.

References

1992 births
Living people
2019 FIBA Basketball World Cup players
Alba Berlin players
BC Mažeikiai players
BC Rytas players
BC Šiauliai players
Liga ACB players
Lithuanian expatriate basketball people in Germany
Lithuanian expatriate basketball people in Spain
Lithuanian men's basketball players
People from Tauragė
Saski Baskonia players
Shooting guards
Small forwards